Allan Ungar is a Canadian film director, producer, and screenwriter known for directing the true crime drama Bandit, the Uncharted Live Action Fan Film, and the Netflix action thriller Gridlocked.

Career 
When Ungar was 23 years old, he was hired to write and direct his first feature film Tapped Out, an MMA drama starring Michael Biehn, Anderson Silva, Krzysztof Soszynski and Martin Kove. Lionsgate Home Entertainment released the film on May 27, 2014. Ungar followed up his debut with the throwback action thriller, Gridlocked, starring Dominic Purcell, Danny Glover, Stephen Lang, Trish Stratus, and Saul Rubinek. The film had its world premiere at Fantastic Fest where it was sold to Netflix after being well received by audiences. Variety praised it as "brutally and divertingly efficient" while other critics called it an authentic tribute to buddy cop films of the 80s and 90s. The film was released by Netflix on June 14, 2016.

On July 16, 2018, Ungar and Nathan Fillion released a live action short film based on the Naughty Dog franchise Uncharted. The short immediately went viral and received critical acclaim for its witty humor, action, and ability to stay true to the source material. Fans and critics began campaigning for Netflix or YouTube to turn it into a series while referring to it as one of the best adaptations of a video game.

Ungar directed and produced the crime drama Bandit, a biopic based on the true story of The Flying Bandit starring Josh Duhamel, Elisha Cuthbert, Nestor Carbonell, and Mel Gibson. It was released theatrically by Quiver Distribution and Redbox Entertainment on September 23, 2022 to positive reviews. Critics declared it Josh Duhamel's career-best performance and gave praise to Ungar's brisk direction. One month after the film was released, Redbox announced that it was the most watched original title of 2022 and their 2nd-best release ever. It debuted as the #1 film on both Paramount Plus and Apple TV Canada, and was the most watched film across multiple categories on iTunes.

After the success of Uncharted, Ungar became involved in the development of several adaptations based on popular gaming IP, including the best-selling Ubisoft franchise Driver and the beloved first person shooter System Shock. On December 16, 2022 it was announced that he would be serving as an Executive Producer on the film adaptation of Death Stranding alongside Hideo Kojima and Barbarian producer Alex Lebovici.

Filmography

References

External links 
 
 
 

Living people
Year of birth missing (living people)
21st-century Canadian screenwriters
Film producers from Ontario
Canadian film editors
Film directors from Toronto
Writers from Toronto
Canadian male screenwriters